Moner Ghore Boshot Kore  is a Bengali-language film directed and written by Zakir Hossain Raju, who directed the 2010 blockbuster film Bhalobaslei Ghor Bandha Jay Na. The film stars Shakib Khan, Apu Biswas, Chanchala Chanchu (in her film debut), Misha Sawdagor, Rehana Jolly, Kazi Hayat, and Elias Kobra, and the film declared hit at the Box Office.

Cast
 Shakib Khan 
 Apu Biswas
 Chanchala Chonchu
 Misha Sawdagor
 Don
 Rehana Jolly
 Kazi Hayat
 Elias Kobra
 Asif Iqbal
 S.I. Tutul - Guest Appearance
 Kaniz Suborna - Guest Appearance

Music
Moner Ghore Boshot Kore was scored by  Ali Akram Shuvo.

Production
The film was shot in Bangladesh and Thailand

Critical reception
Daud Hossain Rony of The Daily Kaler Kantho of Bangladesh gave the film 2.5 out of 5 stars.

References

External links 

2011 films
Bengali-language Bangladeshi films
Bangladeshi drama films
Films shot in Thailand
Films scored by Ali Akram Shuvo
2010s Bengali-language films
2011 drama films